Cumbria Fire and Rescue Service is the statutory fire and rescue service for the Shire county of Cumbria, England. Since 2012, the headquarters for the service's 38 fire stations are at Penrith next to the headquarters of Cumbria Constabulary.

History
Prior to 1947, there was the National Fire Service and before that there were various independent services run by volunteers in villages, towns and cities throughout the country. Cumbria Fire Service was formed in 1974 after local government was reorganised. It took in Cumberland Fire Service, Westmorland Fire Service, Carlisle and Barrow Fire Services and parts of Lancashire and Yorkshire. In 2005, the service changed its name to Cumbria Fire & Rescue service to reflect the new responsibilities it now has.

Performance
In 2018/2019, every fire and rescue service in England and Wales was subjected to a statutory inspection by Her Majesty's Inspectorate of Constabulary and Fire & Rescue Services (HIMCFRS). The inspection investigated how well the service performs in each of three areas. The service was inspected again as part of the tranche of 2021/2022 inspections.
On a scale of outstanding, good, requires improvement and inadequate, Cumbria Fire and Rescue Service was rated as follows:

Fire stations 
Of the 38 fire stations,
there are six wholetime in Barrow-in-Furness, Carlisle East and West, Whitehaven, Workington and Kendal), of which three are supported by retained firefighters; two day-crewed (Ulverston and Penrith); and 30 retained.

The fire stations are split Cumbria into three areas, each containing two of the county's districts:
Allerdale and Copeland 
Barrow and South Lakeland
Carlisle and Eden

Incidents of note
 8 January 2005 – Carlisle and North Cumbria Floods, the worst flooding in living memory caused massive disruption and damage across the county. More than 3,000 properties were affected, 60,000 homes were without power and some areas of Carlisle were under  of water.
 5 November 2006 – Over 100 firefighters from across South Cumbria fought a major fire which eventually destroyed two of Barrow's largest superstores (MFI and Allied Carpets).
 2 January 2008 – Dozens of firefighters fight a large blaze in Barrow's Matalan store, just next door to a construction site where MFI once stood.
 11 January 2017 – Over 50 firefighters fight a large blaze in the old House of Lords building connected to Bar Continental in Barrow-in-Furness.  The fire caused the building to at least partially collapse.

See also

Fire service in the United Kingdom
Cumbria Constabulary
List of British firefighters killed in the line of duty

References

External links

 
Cumbria Fire and Rescue Service at HMICFRS

Fire and rescue services of England
Organisations based in Cumbria
1974 establishments in England